In geometry, the truncated tetraapeirogonal tiling is a semiregular tiling of the hyperbolic plane. There are one square, one octagon, and one apeirogon on each vertex.  It has Schläfli symbol of tr{∞,4}.

Related polyhedra and tilings

Symmetry

The dual of this tiling represents the fundamental domains of [∞,4], (*∞42) symmetry. There are 15 small index subgroups constructed from [∞,4] by mirror removal and alternation. Mirrors can be removed if its branch orders are all even, and cuts neighboring branch orders in half. Removing two mirrors leaves a half-order gyration point where the removed mirrors met. In these images fundamental domains are alternately colored black and white, and mirrors exist on the boundaries between colors. The subgroup index-8 group, [1+,∞,1+,4,1+] (∞2∞2) is the commutator subgroup of [∞,4].

A larger subgroup is constructed as [∞,4*], index 8, as [∞,4+], (4*∞) with gyration points removed, becomes (*∞∞∞∞) or (*∞4), and another [∞*,4], index ∞ as [∞+,4], (∞*2) with gyration points removed as (*2∞). And their direct subgroups [∞,4*]+, [∞*,4]+, subgroup indices 16 and ∞ respectively, can be given in orbifold notation as (∞∞∞∞) and (2∞).

See also 

 Tilings of regular polygons
 List of uniform planar tilings

References
 John H. Conway, Heidi Burgiel, Chaim Goodman-Strass, The Symmetries of Things 2008,  (Chapter 19, The Hyperbolic Archimedean Tessellations)

External links 

 Hyperbolic and Spherical Tiling Gallery

Apeirogonal tilings
Hyperbolic tilings
Isogonal tilings
Semiregular tilings
Truncated tilings